Irakli Bugridze (born 3 January 1998) is a Georgian professional footballer who plays for Torpedo Kutaisi.

Honours

Dinamo Tbilisi
Erovnuli Liga: 2020

Torpedo Kutaisi
Georgian Cup: 2022

References

External links
 
 
 Erovnuli Liga Player Profile

1998 births
Footballers from Tbilisi
Living people
Footballers from Georgia (country)
Expatriate footballers from Georgia (country)
Georgia (country) under-21 international footballers
Association football midfielders
FC Lokomotivi Tbilisi players
FC Dinamo Tbilisi players
FC Chikhura Sachkhere players
K Beerschot VA players
Erovnuli Liga players
Challenger Pro League players
Georgia (country) youth international footballers
Expatriate footballers in Belgium
Expatriate sportspeople from Georgia (country) in Belgium